Mohd Lutfi Zaim Abdul Khalid (born 3 October 1989) is a former Malaysian male badminton player. In 2007, he reached the final round of the Asian Junior Championships in the boys' doubles event and won the silver medal after being defeated by the Chinese pair. In 2008, he won the mixed doubles title at the Malaysia International tournament partnered with Lim Yin Loo. In 2013, he competed at the Summer Universiade in Kazan, Russia. He is currently the Malaysian national junior under-18 boys' doubles coach.

Achievements

Asian Junior Championships 
Boys' doubles

BWF International Challenge/Series
Men's Doubles

Mixed Doubles

 BWF International Challenge tournament
 BWF International Series tournament

References

External links
 

Malaysian male badminton players
1989 births
Living people
People from Pahang
Competitors at the 2011 Southeast Asian Games
Southeast Asian Games silver medalists for Malaysia
Southeast Asian Games medalists in badminton